Whittaker Wood is a woodland in Greater Manchester, England, near Littleborough. It is owned and managed by the Woodland Trust.

References

Forests and woodlands of Greater Manchester
Littleborough, Greater Manchester